Norman Alexander Dunn, JP (born 27 June 1967) is a Jamaican politician and sitting Member of Parliament for Saint Mary South Eastern.

Biography

Early life 
Born in Annotto Bay, a major town in the parish of St. Mary. He went on to pursue his secondary education at the Dinthill Technical High School before attending the University of Technology. He holds a Doctor of Pharmacy Degree, Master of Science in Industrial Business and a Bachelor of Science Degree in Management, Economics and Accounting.

Career 
Dunn is a pharmacist by profession and is a former president of the Pharmaceutical Society of Jamaica. He also served as the Vice President of Jamaica Association of Private Pharmacy Owners and the Third Vice President of the Caribbean Association of Pharmacists. Dunn attributed his business skills to his upbringing- having sold in the local market with his mother and sisters.

Representational Politics 
Dunn's foray into representational politics began in 2016 on a Jamaica Labour Party (JLP) ticket. Having declared the winner on election day, Dunn later lost the magisterial recount by five votes to the People's National Party (PNP) candidate, Dr Winston Green. He never accepted the loss to Green and filed an election petition.

2017 By-Elections 
Following the passing of the sitting MP, Winston Green on August 17, 2017, Dunn became the JLP standard bearer for the hotly contested by-election which took place on October 31, 2017. Dunn was declared winner of the seat- defeating Shane Alexis of the People's National Party. Dunn received 8,176 votes to defeat Alexis, who polled 7,239 votes. The win for the JLP in St. Mary increased their margin in the House of Representatives.

References

Members of the House of Representatives of Jamaica
Jamaica Labour Party politicians
1967 births
Living people
21st-century Jamaican politicians
People from Saint Mary Parish, Jamaica
Members of the 13th Parliament of Jamaica
Members of the 14th Parliament of Jamaica